The  is a rapid transit line owned by the third-sector company Tōyō Rapid Railway Co., Ltd., which runs between Nishi-Funabashi Station in Funabashi, Chiba and Tōyō-Katsutadai Station in Yachiyo, Chiba. The name  comes from the characters for Tokyo and Chiba. The line is an extension of the Tokyo Metro Tōzai Line.

Operation
Almost every train on the Toyo Rapid Railway makes through services with the Tokyo Metro Tōzai Line. However, due to Tōyō Rapid Railway vehicles (namely the Tōyō Rapid 2000 series) not being equipped with ATS-P, they can not operate on the Chūō–Sōbu Line, which uses this method of safety equipment. The same goes for E231-800 series sets, which can not go direct to the Tōyō Rapid Railway Line. Despite this, Tokyo Metro vehicles can operate on all lines.

Current train services
There are three train service types on the Tōyō Rapid Railway, however, all trains stop at every station the Tōyō Rapid Railway Line.

Rapid (快速)
Operates between Tōyō-Katsutadai and Nakano stations and sometimes to Mitaka. Most services on the Toyo Rapid Railway use this service. While it stops at every station on the Tōyō Rapid Railway Line, the section between Nishi-Funabashi and Tōyōchō on the Tokyo Metro Tōzai Line is non-stop except for a stop at Urayasu, then the service stops at all stations west of Tōyōchō. Most morning and afternoon trains go direct to Mitaka on the Chūō–Sōbu Line.

Commuter Rapid (通勤快速)
Like the Rapid Service, it also operates between Tōyō-Katsutadai and Nakano stations and in the morning and afternoon to Mitaka, and stops at every station on the Tōyō Rapid Railway Line. Only operates in the "up" direction on mornings towards Nakano. It is non-stop between Nishi-Funabashi and Urayasu before stopping at every station west of Urayasu.

Local (各駅停車)
This service only operates on rush hours when services on the Tokyo Metro Tōzai Line make through services with the Tōyō Rapid Railway Line, and sometimes goes to Mitaka station on the Chūō–Sōbu Line. This service stops at all stations on the Tōyō Rapid Railway Line, Tokyo Metro Tōzai Line and the Chūō–Sōbu Line.

Former services

Tōyō Rapid (東葉快速)
From the revised timetable on the 4 December 1999, the "Toyo Rapid" service was created. It stopped at Nishi-Funabashi, Kita-Narashino, Yachiyo-Midorigaoka and Tōyō-Katsutadai. Due to congestion on tracks, on March 14, 2009, the timetable changed to have 4 evening "up" bound Tōyō Rapid trains, thus the "down" service towards Tōyō-Katsutadai was abolished. Due to passenger counts increasing on stops that the Tōyō Rapid did not stop at, the Tōyō Rapid service was completely abolished on the March 14 2014 timetable change.

Stations
 All services stop at every station.

Rolling stock
 Tōyō Rapid 2000 series (only go as far as Nakano, due to lack of ATS-P)
 Tokyo Metro 05/N series
 Tokyo Metro 07 series
 Tokyo Metro 15000 series

Former
Tōyō Rapid 1000 series (retired in 2006)
Tokyo Metro 5000 series (retired in 2007)

History
Construction work on the line commenced in July 1984, and the line was fully opened on 27 April 1996. Limited-stop  services were introduced on the line from the start of the 4 December 1999 timetable revision. Such services in the "up" direction (toward Tokyo) were discontinued in 2009, and the "down" limited-stop services were discontinued from the start of the revised timetable on 15 March 2014.

References

External links

  
  

Railway lines in Japan
Railway lines in Chiba Prefecture
1067 mm gauge railways in Japan
Railway lines opened in 1996
Japanese third-sector railway lines